Diego Ormaechea (born 19 July 1959) is a former Uruguayan rugby union player and a current coach. He played as a number eight. Ormaechea is considered the greatest Uruguayan rugby player of all time. His contribution to rugby has been significant, not only as a player and coach, but as an inspirational personality that attracts many youngsters to the sport.

His profession is Veterinary Surgeon specialised in Racing Horses. He is one of the top veterinary surgeons in South America in his discipline.

His son, Agustín Ormaechea, is a current Uruguayan international rugby union player.

Playing career
Ormaechea was born in Montevideo, Uruguay. He was introduced to rugby as a fifteen-year-old in 1976, and played for over two decades. He played most of his career at Carrasco Polo Club, winning the national championship thirteen times.

He also holds the national record for Uruguay, with 73 caps and 16 tries scored, 79 points in aggregate, during 20 years, from 1979 to 1999.

Ormaechea, aged 40 years old, was also the oldest player ever at the Rugby World Cup finals, in 1999, being the captain in his country first ever presence at the event. He scored a try in the 27-15 win over Spain.

He left rugby for a year, but later returned for a final season at Carrasco Polo Club, before putting an end to his long career, in 2001, aged 41.

Coaching
Ormaechea was the coach of the Uruguay national team that qualified and played at the 2003 Rugby World Cup finals. He managed to win again a game, at the 24-12 defeat of Georgia.

Ormaechea is currently the coach of Carrasco Polo Club.

Together with his friends Washington Amarillo and Eduardo Loedel Soca, he promoted and implemented the changes that allowed Uruguay to participate in all Under 17, 18, 19 and 20, as well as Sevens, international competitions.

Honors
 In 2019, World Rugby inducts Ormaechea to its Hall of Fame, the first Uruguayan rugby player ever, alongside Richie McCaw, Shiggy Konno, Os du Randt, Peter Fatialofa, and Graham Henry.

References
 Richards, Huw A Game for Hooligans: The History of Rugby Union (Mainstream Publishing, Edinburgh, 2007)

External links

1959 births
Living people
Rugby union players from Montevideo
Uruguayan people of Basque descent
Uruguayan rugby union players
Uruguayan rugby union coaches
Uruguayan veterinarians
Rugby union number eights
World Rugby Hall of Fame inductees
Uruguay international rugby union players
Uruguay national rugby union team coaches